"Beidh Aonach Amárach, (there will be a fair tomorrow) is an Irish folk song. The song tends to be most popular among children and Irish Gaelic learners. The song's author is unclear, but the song traces its roots to the troubadour and trouvère styles which are generally believed to have started in 12th century France.

Synopsis
In the song, it states that there will be a fair the next day in County Clare, Ireland. The girl in the song practically begs her mother to take her. The mother tells her daughter that she is too young to go now, but that she is allowed to go when she gets older. The daughter then tells her mother that she is in love with the cobbler, whom she would prefer over an army officer. Irish singer Joe Heaney claimed that in the original song, the girl said she was in love with the cobbler because she didn't own any shoes and was enticed as soon as she saw a pair of them herself.

Notable Recordings

 Na Casaidigh on their album Irish Childhood Songs in 1997
 Altan on their album Another Sky in 2000
 John Spillane on the album "Irish songs we learned at school" in 2008

References

External links

https://www.lyrics.com/artist/Altan/751
https://www.songlyrics.com/gaelic-storm/beidh-aonach-amarach-lyrics/
https://songmeanings.com/songs/view/3530822107858776032/
https://www.abbygreen.com/cds/einini-collection/beidh_aonach_amarach.html
https://jamesonsisters.com/track/280827/beidh-aonach-amarach
https://johnspillane.ie/shop/irish-songs-we-learned-at-school-ar-ais-aris/
https://itv.ie/an-greasai-brog-lyrics-translation-muireann-nic-amhlaoibh/
https://www.joeheaney.org/en/beidh-aonach-amarach-i-gcontae-an-chlair/

Irish folk songs